Guo Jingkun (21 November 1933 – 17 August 2021) was a Chinese scientist in the fields of materials science and inorganic chemistry. He was a member of the Communist Party and an academician of the Chinese Academy of Sciences.

Biography 
Guo was born in Shanghai, on 21 November 1933, while his ancestral home was in Xinhui, Guangdong. After graduating from Fudan University in 1958, he was despatched to the Shanghai Institute of Ceramics, Chinese Academy of Sciences, where he eventually became director in December 1983. On 17 August 2021, he died in Shanghai, aged 87.

Honours and awards 
 1990 Member of the International Academy of Ceramics
 1991 Member of the Chinese Academy of Sciences
 1997 Member of the Asian and Pacific Academy of Materials Sciences
 1999 Member of The World Academy of Sciences
 2004 Science and Technology Progress Award of the Ho Leung Ho Lee Foundation

References 

1933 births
2021 deaths
Scientists from Shanghai
Fudan University alumni
TWAS fellows
Members of the Chinese Academy of Sciences